Stephen Arbuckle is a Canadian born actor born in the village of Donkin, Nova Scotia.

Career 
Arbuckle started his career as a theatre actor in Cape Breton at the Boardmore Playhouse and Savoy Theatre, along with other independent theatre companies, then made his first move into film in 2003 with the lead role in the short film Todd and the Book of Pure Evil, which also starred Julian Richings, later becoming a TV show on Space as well as an animated film. Since then, he has and continues to appear on many feature films and television series, including: Oliver Peele in 2010 in the pilot episode of the CBS show Blue Bloods, Saving Hope, Murdoch Mysteries, Falling Water, and others.

Filmography

Film

Television

External links

Canadian male television actors
Living people
Year of birth missing (living people)
Cape Breton University alumni
Male actors from Nova Scotia
Canadian male film actors
People from the Cape Breton Regional Municipality